John Youngs may refer to:
 John Youngs (minister) (–1672), English minister who founded Southold, New York
 John E. Youngs (1883–1970), American politician
 John William Theodore Youngs (1910–1970), American mathematician

See also 
John Young (disambiguation)